Hussein El-Sayed (born 11 December 1964), is an Egyptian former professional footballer. He played for ESCO and Zamalek as a goalkeeper.

International career
He represented Egypt in the 1994 African Cup of Nations.

Honours
Zamalek
Egyptian Premier League: 3
 1987–88, 1991–92, 1992–93
Egypt Cup: 2
 1987–88, 1998–99
African Cup of Champions Clubs: 2
 1993, 1996
CAF Super Cup: 2
1994, 1997
Afro-Asian Club Championship: 2
 1987, 1997

References

1964 births
Zamalek SC players
Egyptian footballers
1994 African Cup of Nations players
Living people
Egyptian Premier League players
Association football goalkeepers